Blue Magic is the eponymous debut album by American soul group Blue Magic, produced by Norman Harris and released in 1974 on the Atco label.

History
Blue Magic's debut single "Spell" was released in November 1972 and work on the album began in early 1973.  Two more singles, "Look Me Up" and "Stop to Start" were released during 1973; all performed respectably on the R&B chart with "Stop to Start" also crossing over into the lower reaches of the pop chart.  The album was released on January 9, 1974, followed shortly thereafter by a fourth single, "Sideshow", the lush, dreamy and loss-filled atmosphere of which immediately caught on and became a major hit, topping the R&B chart and reaching No. 8 on the Billboard Hot 100.  Another track on the album was the lengthy "Just Don't Want to Be Lonely", which Ronnie Dyson had taken into the R&B top 30 in July 1973, then became a bigger hit for New York group The Main Ingredient, whose version reached both the R&B and pop top 10 at around the same time Blue Magic was released.  Blue Magic peaked at No. 4 on the R&B album chart and No. 45 on the pop chart.

Music for the album was provided by Sigma Sound Studios' legendary house band MFSB.  Bobby Eli, co-composer of "Sideshow" and "Just Don't Want to Be Lonely", who worked as a guitarist on the album, stated in the liner notes of the 2007 reissue of the album that he believed that Harris was equally at home with uptempo material as with ballads and, citing the tracks "Look Me Up" and "Welcome to the Club" as classic examples of the proto-disco sound of 1973-74, expressed his opinion that Harris' expertise in this field gave Blue Magic the ability to deliver convincing uptempo tracks in a way which largely eluded other Philadelphia soul groups with whom they are usually bracketed, notably The Stylistics and The Delfonics.

Blue Magic was reissued by Rhino Records in 2007, including two B-sides previously unavailable on CD and a remix of "Look Me Up"

Track listing

Personnel
Blue Magic
Vernon Sawyer, Richard Pratt, Wendell Sawyer, Keith Beaton, Ted Mills – vocals

Musicians
Bobby Eli, Norman Harris, Ted Cohen, Roland Chambers – guitars
Ted Mills, Ron Kersey, Cotton Kent – pianos
Ronnie Baker, Jimmy Grant, Lee Smith, Jimmy DeJulio – bass
Earl Young, Larry James – drums
Larry Washington – percussion
Vince Montana – vibes
Don Renaldo and his Strings and Horns – strings & horns accompaniment

Production
Norman Harris – producer, remixing, arrangement
Alan Rubens, Steven Bernstein – producers, executive producers
Bruce Gable – executive producer
Joe Tarsia, Kenny Present, Don Murray, Jay Mark, Carl Paruolo – recording engineers
Vince Montana – arrangement
Carl Helm – vocal arrangement

Charts

Weekly charts

Year-end charts

Singles

References

External links
 

1974 debut albums
Blue Magic (band) albums
Albums produced by Norman Harris
Albums recorded at Sigma Sound Studios
Atco Records albums